Alan Parks (born 1963) is a Scottish crime writer in the Tartan Noir genre. His fifth novel May God Forgive won the 2022 McIlvanney Prize as the best Scottish crime book of the year.

His novels, each including a month of the year in its title, are set in 1970s Glasgow and feature "rather bent copper" Harry McCoy.

Selected publications
 Bloody January (2017)
February's Son (2019)
Bobby March Will Live For Ever (2020)
The April Dead (2021)
May God Forgive (2022)

References

1963 births
Living people
21st-century Scottish novelists